The  was the top singles women's professional wrestling championship in All Japan Women's Pro-Wrestling (AJW) from 1970 until it closed in 2005. It was also known in Pro Wrestling Illustrated and other London Publishing wrestling magazines as the All-Japan Women's International Championship. The title was descended from the original Women's World Championship, which Mildred Burke won in 1937.

On September 2, 2017, the title was revived for one day by former AJW wrestlers Kumiko Maekawa, Manami Toyota, Nanae Takahashi and Yumiko Hotta at an independent event produced by Hotta. The soon-to-retire Toyota then defeated Hotta and was awarded the title belt.

Title history

Combined reigns

See also

 List of professional wrestling promotions in Japan
 List of women's wrestling promotions
 Professional wrestling in Japan
 Women's World Championship
 World of Stardom Championship

References

External links
WWWA World singles title history

All Japan Women's Pro-Wrestling Championships
World professional wrestling championships
Women's professional wrestling championships